San Bartolomé Zoogocho is a town and municipality in Oaxaca in south-western Mexico. The municipality covers an area of 22.96 km². 
It is part of the Villa Alta District in the center of the Sierra Norte Region.

The traditional music is known as jarabe.

Mezcal is often made here and a big part of the culture.

As of 2005, the municipality had a total population of 381.

As of 2013, about 1,500 "Zoogochenses" live in Los Angeles, California, where classes are held to preserve the Zoogocho Zapotec language.

References

Municipalities of Oaxaca